A paraphrase is a restatement of the meaning of a text or passage using other words. The term itself is derived via Latin , . The act of paraphrasing is also called paraphrasis.

History
Although paraphrases likely abounded in oral traditions, paraphrasing as a specific educational exercise dates back to at least Roman times, when the author Quintilian recommended it for students to develop dexterity in language. In the Middle Ages, this tradition continued, with authors such as Geoffrey of Vinsauf developing schoolroom exercises that included both rhetorical manipulations and paraphrasing as a way of generating poems and speeches. Paraphrasing seems to have dropped off as a specific exercise that students learn, a drop off that largely coincides with the removal of Classical texts from the core of Western education. There is, however, renewed interest in the study of paraphrases, given concerns around plagiarism and original authorship.

Analysis
A paraphrase typically explains or clarifies the text that is being paraphrased. For example, "The signal was red" might be paraphrased as "The train was not allowed to pass because the signal was red". A paraphrase is usually introduced with verbum dicendi—a declaratory expression to signal the transition to the paraphrase. For example, in "The signal was red, that is, the train was not allowed to proceed," the that is signals the paraphrase that follows.

A paraphrase does not need to accompany a direct quotation. The paraphrase typically serves to put the source's statement into perspective or to clarify the context in which it appeared. A paraphrase is typically more detailed than a summary. One should add the source at the end of the sentence: When the light was red, trains could not go (Wikipedia).

A paraphrase may attempt to preserve the essential meaning of the material being paraphrased. Thus, the (intentional or otherwise) reinterpretation of a source to infer a meaning that is not explicitly evident in the source itself qualifies as "original research," and not a paraphrase.

Unlike a metaphrase, which represents a "formal equivalent" of the source, a paraphrase represents a "dynamic equivalent" thereof. While a metaphrase attempts to translate a text literally, a paraphrase conveys the essential thought expressed in a source text—if necessary, at the expense of literality. For details, see dynamic and formal equivalence.

Biblical paraphrase
The term is applied to the genre of Biblical paraphrases, which were the most widely circulated versions of the Bible available in medieval Europe.  Here, the purpose was not to render an exact rendition of the meaning or the complete text, but to present material from the Bible in a version that was theologically orthodox and not subject to heretical interpretation, or, in most cases, to take from the Bible and present to a wide public material that was interesting, entertaining and spiritually meaningful, or, simply to abridge the text.

In your own words
The phrase "in your own words" is often used within this context to imply that the writer has rewritten the text in their own writing style – how they would have written it if they had created the idea. Nowadays, there are some models to learn and recognize paraphrase on natural language texts. Sentences can also be automatically paraphrased using text simplification software.

See also
 Automated paraphrasing
 Text simplification
 Rogeting

References

Rhetoric
Translation studies